Adobe Aero is an augmented reality authoring and publishing tool by Adobe Inc. on Creative Cloud. Aero is available for iOS, although there are versions for macOS and Windows which are currently in public beta. Adobe Aero was originally announced as a private beta for iOS users at Adobe MAX 2018, seeing its official launch at Adobe MAX 2019.

Aero is part of Adobe's 3D and AR series, which also includes Dimension, Mixamo, and Substance by Adobe.

References

Adobe Inc.
Augmented reality applications